Store Skagastølstind (also known as Storen) is the third highest peak in Norway. It is situated on the border between the municipality of Luster and Årdal in Vestland county, Norway.  The  mountain is part of the Hurrungane range.  The mountains Vetle Skagastølstind and Midtre Skagastølstind lie immediately to the north of this mountain and the mountains Sentraltind and Jervvasstind lie immediately to the east of this mountain.

The summit is a popular destination for mountaineers, but it is fairly difficult to climb. The first ascent was made by William Cecil Slingsby on 21 July 1876. There are a number of different routes, the most popular being Heftyes renne (Heftye's couloir).  Another popular route of ascent is via Andrews renne (Andrew's couloir), used in the first ascent of A. W. Andrews and party in 1899. Store Skagastølstind and the mountaineering of the late 19th century in Norway is traditionally linked to the historical hotel Turtagrø.

Name
The first element is the genitive of the name of the mountain farm Skagastølen and the last element is tind which means "mountain peak".  The mountain farm (dairy farm) Skagastølen belongs to the farm Skagen in Luster and  stølen is the finite form of støl which means "mountain farm". Skagen is the finite form of skage which means "headland" or "promontory" and the name is equivalent with the famous Skagen in Denmark.  Store or Storen means "The Big".

Disputes
Slingsby's first ascent in 1876 was hailed as a major achievement, and Johannes Heftye soon felt it eclipsed his own first ascent of Store Knutsholstinden the year before. He set out to ascend Storen in 1880 and successfully used the popular route that is now named after him to reach the summit. This route is significantly more difficult than Slingsby's route, and also more difficult than Heftye's own route on Store Knutsholstind, however, Heftye downplayed this achievement to emphasize his own first ascent. His main claim was that Store Knutsholstind was at least as difficult as Storen, thus, must be regarded a first grade mountain.

While Heftye's route on Store Knutsholstind may have been slightly more difficult than Slingsby's route on Storen, Heftye was at the time unaware that there were an easier route on Store Knutsholstind. Slingsby was approached by Marie Sønstenes, a woman who lived on farm near Store Knutsholstind, who claimed that she knew a straightforward route. Together, they ascended the mountain by this route. Heftye, who was very outspoken against female mountaineers, was humiliated and deeply offended.

See also
List of mountains of Norway
Scandinavian mountain range

References

Further reading
  Slingsby's story of the first ascent of Store Skagastølstind in 1876.
  English guidebook to Store Skagastølstind

External links
 Store Skagastølstind at westcoastpeaks.com

Mountains of Vestland
Jotunheimen
Luster, Norway
Årdal
Highest points of Norwegian counties